The Old Federal Building is a historic government building at Cushman Street and 3rd Avenue in Fairbanks, Alaska.  When it was built in 1933, it was the most northern instance of concrete construction in the United States.  It is a large building with three full-height floors and two smaller penthouse levels.  The building's Art Deco styling includes V-shaped grooves set in pilasters that separate columns of windows and aluminum panels.  The grooves are repeated in concrete spandrels above the top row of windows.  Interior decoration includes terrazzo flooring, copious use of marble in walls and floors, and a pressed copper ceiling in the courtroom.  The building was designed by Washington, DC architect George N. Ray, and built by William "Mac" MacDonald, who also later built the Federal Building in Nome.  It originally housed the federal court, post office, and other federal government offices, and the decision to locate it in Fairbanks was critical to the rise of the city's importance; it now houses private offices.

The building was listed on the National Register of Historic Places.

See also
National Register of Historic Places listings in Fairbanks North Star Borough, Alaska

References

1933 establishments in Alaska
Art Deco architecture in Alaska
Buildings and structures completed in 1933
Buildings and structures in Fairbanks, Alaska
Courthouses in Alaska
Buildings and structures on the National Register of Historic Places in Fairbanks North Star Borough, Alaska
Post office buildings on the National Register of Historic Places in Alaska